Apa is a commune of 2,575 inhabitants situated in Satu Mare County, Romania. It is composed of three villages: Apa, Lunca Apei (Apai Lanka) and Someșeni (Szamostelek).

Natives
 Vasile Lucaciu

References

Communes in Satu Mare County